The 2014–15 Albany Great Danes men's basketball team represented the University at Albany, SUNY during the 2014–15 NCAA Division I men's basketball season. The Great Danes, led by 14th year head coach Will Brown, played their home games at SEFCU Arena and were members of the America East Conference. They finished the season 24–9, 15–1 in America East play to win the American East regular season championship. They defeated Maine, New Hampshire, and Stony Brook to become champions of the America East tournament. They received an automatic bid to the NCAA tournament where they lost in the second round to Oklahoma.

Roster

Schedule

|-
!colspan=12 style="background:#452663; color:#FFC726;"| Regular season

|-
!colspan=12 style="background:#452663; color:#FFC726;"| America East tournament

|-
!colspan=12 style="background:#452663; color:#FFC726;"| NCAA tournament

References

Albany Great Danes men's basketball seasons
Albany
Albany
Albany Great Danes men's basketball
Albany Great Danes men's basketball